Khyiris Tonga (born July 7, 1996) is an American football nose tackle for the Minnesota Vikings of the National Football League (NFL). He played college football at BYU and was drafted by the Chicago Bears in the seventh round of the 2021 NFL Draft.

College career 
Initially committed to Utah after high school, Tonga flipped to BYU after former Oregon State defensive coordinator Kalani Sitake was named the Cougars' head coach while Tonga was serving his two-year mission.

After a strong junior season where he made 45 tackles, Tonga was expected to be an NFL draft prospect, but announced he would return for his senior season.

Professional career 

Tonga was praised by draft analysts for his ability to eat up space as a nose tackle, but was expected to be a day three prospect due to his age, short arms, and below-average hand size.

Chicago Bears
Tonga was drafted by the Chicago Bears in the seventh round, 250th overall, of the 2021 NFL Draft. On June 2, 2021, Tonga signed his four-year rookie contract with Chicago. He was waived by the Bears on August 31, 2022.

Atlanta Falcons
On September 5, 2022, Tonga was signed to the Atlanta Falcons practice squad.

Minnesota Vikings
On October 5, 2022, Tonga was signed by the Minnesota Vikings off the Falcons practice squad.

Personal life 
Before enrolling at BYU, Tonga served a two-year mission for the Church of Jesus Christ of Latter-day Saints in Wichita, Kansas.

References

External links 
 
 Minnesota Vikings bio
 BYU Cougars bio

1996 births
Living people
Players of American football from Utah
People from West Valley City, Utah
American Mormon missionaries in the United States
American football defensive tackles
BYU Cougars football players
Chicago Bears players
Atlanta Falcons players
Minnesota Vikings players